Harold Sylvester (born February 10, 1949) is an American film and television actor.

Early life and education
Sylvester was born in New Orleans, Louisiana. He is a graduate of New Orleans' St. Augustine High School and Tulane University. Turning down Harvard, he attended Tulane on a basketball scholarship and graduated in 1972 with a degree in theater and psychology. He was the first African American to receive an athletic scholarship from Tulane.

Career
Sylvester is best known for his role on the TV series Married... with Children as Griff, the co-worker and friend of Al Bundy at the shoe store. Harold's other TV roles include the miniseries Wheels (1978), Sylvester was in Barnaby Jones, episode titled “A Desperate Pursuit”(10/11/1979), the short-lived 1981 series Walking Tall, Today's F.B.I., Mary (1985), Shaky Ground, and "A Different World". The most recent TV show in which he starred was The Army Show. Sylvester had a recurring role on the TV series City of Angels. He has made guest appearances on shows, ranging from The Eddie Capra Mysteries to Hill Street Blues to Murder, She Wrote to NYPD Blue.

His first Hollywood role was as Nathan, a lead character in Part 2, Sounder, the sequel to Sounder. His better known film roles are in supporting roles in An Officer and a Gentleman (1982), Uncommon Valor (1983), Innerspace (1987), and Corrina, Corrina (1994). He was a contract player for Universal Studios.

Sylvester wrote the screenplay for the 1998 TV movie Passing Glory. This screenplay was based on some of his experiences playing basketball in high school, including a groundbreaking game of St. Augustine High School's all-black team against Jesuit High School's all-white team.

The Amistad Research Center of New Orleans, Louisiana, maintains a collection of Harold Sylvester's papers that document his correspondence, film and television scripts, and materials reflecting his involvement with the Free Southern Theater and his Blue Bayou Productions Company.

Personal life

Sylvester has been married to Kathleen since 1970. They have two children.

Filmography

References
4. Demetria Fulton previewed Sylvester in Barnaby Jones; episode titled, “A Desperate Pursuit” (10/11/1979).

External links 
 
 Harold Sylvester Speech at Education Conference, 2004 on YouTube
 Sylvester's Blue Bayou Productions Co.

1949 births
Living people
20th-century American male actors
21st-century American male actors
African-American male actors
American male film actors
American male television actors
Male actors from New Orleans
St. Augustine High School (New Orleans) alumni
Tulane University alumni